Miriam Smith (born September 25, 1958) is an American former competition swimmer who represented the United States at the 1976 Summer Olympics in Montreal, Quebec.  Smith swam in the preliminary heats of the women's 200-meter backstroke event, and recorded a time 2:22.05.

References

1958 births
Living people
American female backstroke swimmers
Olympic swimmers of the United States
People from Mount Holly, New Jersey
Swimmers at the 1976 Summer Olympics
Sportspeople from Burlington County, New Jersey
21st-century American women